Faryadras (also Romanized as Faryādras) is a village in Jalalvand Rural District, Firuzabad District, Kermanshah County, Kermanshah Province, Iran. At the 2006 census, its population was 32, in 6 families.

References 

Populated places in Kermanshah County